The Kafue lechwe or Kafue Flats lechwe (Kobus leche kafuensis) is a subspecies of the southern lechwe. It is endemic to the Kafue Flats, Zambia. It is listed on the IUCN Red List as vulnerable.

References

Marsh antelopes
Mammals of Zambia
Endemic fauna of Zambia
Kafue lechwe